Narine Ragoo (born 10 August 1942) is a Trinidadian cricketer. He played in twenty first-class matches for Trinidad and Tobago from 1962 to 1979.

See also
 List of Trinidadian representative cricketers

References

External links
 

1942 births
Living people
Trinidad and Tobago cricketers